Gymnocalycium baldianum, the spider-cactus or dwarf chin cactus, is a species of flowering plant in the cactus family Cactaceae, native to the Catamarca Province in Argentina.

Description
It is a globose cactus, spherical or a little flat, with a diameter up to 8 cm, dark green in colour, or sometimes brown. It has 8 to 10 ribs with tubercle-shaped areoles, covered in groups of 6 to 8 pale grey, curved spines, giving to the species its common name of spider-cactus. Like many cacti, it does not divide but may form offsets after some years.
The funnel-shaped flowers reach a diameter of 6 cm, growing near the apex of the plant and are red, pink or orange.

Cultivation
Gymnocalycium baldianum is easy to grow. It needs a well-drained soil. In summer, water the plants well, but let them to dry before watering again. Use monthly a fertilizer for cacti. The exposure must be sunny in summer and at least brightly lit in winter.

This species has gained the Royal Horticultural Society’s Award of Garden Merit.

Gallery

References

baldianum
Cacti of South America
Endemic flora of Argentina
Garden plants of South America
Least concern plants
Least concern biota of South America
Plants described in 1905
Taxa named by Carlo Luigi Spegazzini